Kashgar railway station (喀什站) is the main railway station of Kashgar, Xinjiang and the westernmost railway station in China. It is the western terminus for the Southern Xinjiang and Kashgar–Hotan Railways.

The station is located northeast of the city of Kashgar and is served by regular passenger trains to Ürümqi via Turpan. A trip on the faster kind (K-series) takes under 22 hours from Kashgar to Turpan or just over 24 hours to Ürümqi.

History 
The station opened in 1999.

References

External links

Railway stations in Xinjiang
Railway stations in China opened in 1999
Stations on the Kashgar–Hotan Railway
Stations on the Southern Xinjiang Railway